Tiporus is a genus of beetles in the family Dytiscidae, containing the following species:

 Tiporus alastairi (Watts, 1978)
 Tiporus centralis (Watts, 1978)
 Tiporus collaris (Hope, 1841)
 Tiporus denticulatus (Watts, 1978)
 Tiporus georginae Watts, 2000
 Tiporus giuliani (Watts, 1978)
 Tiporus josepheni (Watts, 1978)
 Tiporus lachlani Watts, 2000
 Tiporus moriartyensis Watts, 2000
 Tiporus tambreyi (Watts, 1978)
 Tiporus undecimmaculatus (Clark, 1862)

References

Dytiscidae genera